β-D-Glucopyranosyloxymethyluracil or base J is a hypermodified nucleobase found in the DNA of kinetoplastids including the human pathogenic trypanosomes. It was discovered in 1993, in the trypanosome Trypanosoma brucei and was the first hypermodified nucleobase found in eukaryotic DNA; it has since been found in other kinetoplastids, including Leishmania.
Within these organisms Base J acts as a RNA polymerase II transcription terminator, with its removal in knockout cells being accompanied by a massive read-through at RNA polymerase II termination sites, which ultimately proves lethal to the cell.

Base J is formed by the initial hydroxylation of thymidine and the subsequent glycosylation by an as yet unidentified glycosyltransferase.

References 

Nucleobases
Pyrimidinediones
Glucosides